Bogdan is the brand of the Ukrainian buses and trolleybuses made by Bogdan Corporation. The original two front-engine/rear-wheel drive models (Bohdan A091 and Bohdan A092) are powered by Isuzu and marketed outside Ukraine under Isuzu brand. Large city buses, such as the rear-engined Bogdan A145 and Bohdan A1445, are also produced. The production is situated in the city of Cherkasy, although there are plans of moving it to the LuAZ plant in the city of Lutsk. These vehicles are generally serving as marshrutka (routed taxicab / minibus) in former Soviet regions. The plant was originally the Cherkasy Autorepair Plant, which was founded in 1964.

Current models

Buses

Small class buses 
 Bogdan A069

Medium class buses 
 Bogdan A092
 Bogdan A093
 Bogdan A092.80 (half-low-floor midibus)
 Bogdan A401.62

Large class buses 
 Bogdan A1445
 Bogdan A1452
 Bogdan A601.10 (10,6 meter half-low floor)
 Bogdan A701.12 (12,0 meter low floor launched in 2011)
 Bogdan A701.90 (12,0 meter low floor Airport bus). Launched in 2011 or 2012.

Extra large class buses 
 Bogdan A231 (production stopped in 2009)
 Bogdan A801.10 (15 meter low-floor), launched in early 2010.

Trolleybuses 
 Bogdan E231 (14,5 meter low-floor with Dynamo DC Motor). Made in 2007–2008, only 8 trolleys were made.
 Bogdan T601.11 (10,6 meter low-floor, with Electrotjazhmash DC Motor). Launched in 2008.
 Bogdan T701.10 (12,0 meter low-floor, with Electrotjazhmash DC Motor). Launched in 2010.
 Bogdan Т701.15 (12,0 meter low-floor, with Pragoimex AC Motor). Launched in 2010.
 Bogdan T701.20 (12,0 meter low-floor, 2 doors, situated in front and rear overhangs. Made for Crimea intercity trolleybus system). Launched in 2011.
 Bogdan T801.10 (15,0 meter low-floor, with a Russian DC motor). Launched in 2009.
 Bogdan T901.10 (18,7 meter low-floor articulated, with 2 Electrotjazhmash DC Motors). Launched in 2010.

Gallery

References

External links

 www.luaz.com Bogdan buses (parked page)
 www.luaz.com Bohdan trolleybuses (parked page)

Vehicles of Ukraine
Road transport in Ukraine
Ukrainian brands